AEW Battle of the Belts is a series of professional wrestling television specials produced by American promotion All Elite Wrestling (AEW). The one-hour specials are broadcast on TNT in the United States and air quarterly throughout the year. The series currently airs on select Friday nights at 11 p.m. Eastern Time (ET) immediately after AEW's regular Friday program, Rampage; the series originally aired on select Saturday nights at 8 p.m. ET, but was moved to Fridays beginning with the fourth episode. Battle of the Belts premiered with a live episode on January 8, 2022. The fifth and most recent special aired live on January 6, 2023.

The theme of the show is that all matches are contested for professional wrestling championships. Thus far, six of AEW's championships have been defended on the specials, as well as two championships from AEW's sister promotion Ring of Honor (ROH). These include the AEW Women's World Championship, the AEW TNT Championship, the AEW TBS Championship, the AEW All-Atlantic Championship, the AEW World Tag Team Championship, the FTW Championship, the ROH World Championship, and the ROH World Tag Team Championship.

History
In May 2021, All Elite Wrestling (AEW) renegotiated its broadcasting deal with WarnerMedia which saw AEW's flagship television program, Wednesday Night Dynamite, move from TNT to TBS in January 2022, while its other core program, Friday Night Rampage, remained on TNT. Also as part of the deal, AEW agreed to produce four quarterly television specials on TNT that would take place on Saturdays. Former AEW executive and wrestler Cody Rhodes said that these specials would be similar to Jim Crockett Promotions/World Championship Wrestling's Clash of the Champions and WWE's Saturday Night's Main Event shows, calling them super events. Wrestling journalist Dave Meltzer reported that the quarterly specials would be one-hour shows, but said they were originally planned to be longer, and also that they would feature pay-per-view caliber cards.

On November 24, 2021, the television special series was announced to be titled Battle of the Belts with the inaugural event scheduled to be held live on January 8, 2022, at the Bojangles Coliseum in Charlotte, North Carolina. The tagline was confirmed as "Saturday Fight Night". The name "Battle of the Belts" comes from a National Wrestling Alliance event held from 1985 to 1987 by the promotion's Florida territory that was operated by Eddie Graham.

AEW President Tony Khan confirmed that due to the show's one-hour length, not all of AEW's championships would be defended on the specials, but their goal was to put on great championship matches. On the day of the inaugural event, Khan revealed that matches for the January 11 episode of their YouTube show, Dark, were scheduled to be taped before the Battle of the Belts I live broadcast, with all other AEW champions participating in these Dark matches.

On February 15, 2022, AEW announced that Battle of the Belts II would be taped on April 15 at the Curtis Culwell Center in Garland, Texas. It aired on tape delay the next day on April 16. A month after Tony Khan's purchase of Ring of Honor (ROH), the ROH World Championship was scheduled to be defended at Battle of the Belts II. On June 1, 2022, Battle of the Belts III was announced to be taped on August 5 at the Van Andel Arena in Grand Rapids, Michigan, and it aired the following day on August 6.

On August 4, 2022, Battle of the Belts IV was announced to be held on Friday, October 7 at the Entertainment and Sports Arena in Washington, D.C. As Battle of the Belts was established as a Saturday night television special, it was expected that Battle of the Belts IV would air on tape delay the next day on October 8. However, due to WWE's Extreme Rules pay-per-view airing that night, Battle of the Belts IV was instead scheduled to air live on October 7 at 11 p.m. Eastern Time (ET) right after the live broadcast of Rampage to avoid counter programming against WWE. Due to its Friday scheduling, its tagline was changed to "Friday Fight Night". This was also the first Battle of the Belts episode to not include matches for either the AEW Women's World Championship or AEW TNT Championship, but it did include an ROH World Tag Team Championship match.

On November 2, 2022, it was announced that the Battle of the Belts series would continue with Battle of the Belts V scheduled to air live on Friday, January 6, 2023, at the Veterans Memorial Coliseum in Portland, Oregon. Battle of the Belts VI was also revealed to be held on April 7, 2023, at the Ryan Center in Kingston, Rhode Island.

Events

Results

Battle of the Belts I 

Battle of the Belts I took place on January 8, 2022, at the Bojangles Coliseum in Charlotte, North Carolina. The event aired live at 8 p.m. ET. In the main event, Dr. Britt Baker, D.M.D. defeated Riho to retain the AEW Women's World Championship. On the undercard, Ricky Starks defeated Matt Sydal to retain the FTW Championship and in the opening bout, Sammy Guevara defeated Dustin Rhodes to become the interim AEW TNT Champion; Guevara was originally scheduled to face lineal champion Cody Rhodes for the title, however, Cody was pulled due to COVID-19-related issues.

Battle of the Belts II

Battle of the Belts II was taped on April 15, 2022, at the Curtis Culwell Center in Garland, Texas. It aired on tape delay the next day on April 16 at 8 p.m. ET. In the main event, Thunder Rosa retained the AEW Women's World Championship against Nyla Rose. On the undercard, Jonathan Gresham defeated Dalton Castle to retain the ROH World Championship and in the opening bout, Sammy Guevara defeated Scorpio Sky to win the AEW TNT Championship for a record-tying third time.

Battle of the Belts III

Battle of the Belts III was taped on August 5, 2022, at the Van Andel Arena in Grand Rapids, Michigan. It aired on tape delay the next day on August 6 at 8 p.m. ET. In the main event, Claudio Castagnoli retained the ROH World Championship against Konosuke Takeshita. On the undercard, Thunder Rosa defeated Jamie Hayter to retain the AEW Women's World Championship and in the opening bout, Wardlow defeated Jay Lethal to retain the AEW TNT Championship.

Battle of the Belts IV

Battle of the Belts IV took place on October 7, 2022, at the Entertainment and Sports Arena in Washington, D.C. As Battle of the Belts was established as a Saturday night television special, it was expected that Battle of the Belts IV would air on tape delay the next day on October 8; however, to avoid counter programming against WWE's Extreme Rules pay-per-view that night, Battle of the Belts IV was scheduled to air live on Friday, October 7 at 11 p.m. ET immediately after the live broadcast of AEW's regular Friday program, Rampage. In the main event, FTR (Cash Wheeler and Dax Harwood) defeated Gates of Agony (Toa Liona and Kaun) to retain the ROH World Tag Team Championship. On the undercard, Jade Cargill defeated Willow Nightingale to retain the AEW TBS Championship, and in the opening bout, Pac defeated Trent Beretta to retain the AEW All-Atlantic Championship.

Battle of the Belts V

Battle of the Belts V took place on January 6, 2023, at the Veterans Memorial Coliseum in Portland, Oregon. The show aired live at 11 p.m. ET immediately following the live broadcast of AEW's regular Friday program, Rampage. In the main event, Orange Cassidy defeated Kip Sabian to retain the AEW All-Atlantic Championship. On the undercard, Jade Cargill defeated Skye Blue to retain the AEW TBS Championship and in the opening bout, The Acclaimed (Anthony Bowens and Max Caster) defeated Jeff Jarrett and Jay Lethal in a No Holds Barred Tag team match to retain the AEW World Tag Team Championship.

Battle of the Belts VI

Battle of the Belts VI will take place on April 7, 2023, at the Ryan Center in Kingston, Rhode Island. The show will air live at 11 p.m. ET immediately following the live broadcast of AEW's regular Friday program, Rampage.

See also
 List of All Elite Wrestling special events

References

External links

2020s American television specials
2022 American television episodes
2022 American television series debuts
Events in Charlotte, North Carolina
Events in Garland, Texas
Events in Washington, D.C.
Events in Grand Rapids, Michigan
Events in Portland, Oregon
Events in Kingston, Rhode Island
TNT (American TV network) original programming